The Georgia 300 is a privately owned railroad car owned by John H. "Jack" Heard of Florida. It has been used by several recent presidents for various campaign related Whistle Stop Tours.

History

Georgia 300, as it is called, is a classic looking heavyweight observation car from the golden era of rail travel that was built by the Pullman Standard Co. shops in 1930. Sporting a Packard blue with silver striping livery, the train car operated as a lounge car named the General Polk on the New Orleans-New York Crescent Limited (operated by the L&N, West Point Route, Southern, and Pennsylvania), and was later purchased by the Georgia Railroad and reconfigured to Office Car 300. The Georgia Railroad used the car in trips to venues like The Masters Tournament and the Kentucky Derby. It ran until its retirement in 1982 after being made redundant as surplus due to the merger between Georgia Railroad and Family Lines.

Private ownership
Heard, who owns a rail yard in Orange Park, Florida, purchased the car in 1985 and made a series of refurbishments in 1986, 1989, 1995, 2000 and 2008.  The car has a dining room, an observation lounge, one master bedroom, two additional bedrooms, two bathrooms with showers, a section lounge, crew quarters, and kitchen. It is Amtrak compliant and compatible to be used on most scheduled Amtrak trains as well as other private venues.

The car is a constant work-in-progress with carpets and fabrics constantly being improved.  During 2006–2008, the interior and exterior of the car were completely repainted, along with the addition of new monogrammed linens and bed-coverings in the bedrooms and a recovering of the couch in the observation lounge.

In 2020, the car was on loan to U.S. Sugar Corporation, who used it in excursion service as part of their heritage Sugar Express tourist passenger train.

Use by US Presidents

The Georgia 300 has hosted/carried Presidents George H. W. Bush, Bill Clinton, and Barack Obama. In 2004, presidential candidates John F. Kerry and running mate Sen. John Edwards, traveled aboard the car from St. Louis to Kingman, Ariz. on the Believe In America Train Tour, following the Democratic Convention in Boston.

George H. W. Bush

The Georgia 300 was used as a support car during President George H. W. Bush's re-election campaign in 1992 on a Union Pacific train. This use is thought to have prompted further use of the car by other presidents.

Bill Clinton

The car again was used by Bill Clinton for his Amtrak 21st Century Express train for the 1996 re-election campaign season, in a nod to his 1992 campaign with a bus. The 13-car train used the Georgia 300 along with other Amtrak, private, and host railroad CSX equipment and engines.

Barack Obama

Barack Obama utilized the Georgia 300 twice; first in April 2008 for a trip between Philadelphia and Harrisburg, Pa; and secondly before his 2009 inauguration on a whistle stop to Washington DC with Vice President Joe Biden, along a similar route to that used by Abraham Lincoln. The Federal Aviation Administration (FAA) prevented private planes, news helicopters, balloonists and others from flying anywhere near the airspace above the train route.  These rolling NOTAM flight restrictions prevented general aviation from flying near stations and above the linear route of sections of the Northeast Corridor railroad line "for Special Security Reasons".

The train used consisted of two Amtrak GE Genesis locomotives, numbers 44 and 120, several Amfleet coaches and cafes, and the Georgia 300 at the rear. The lead locomotive 44 was selected due to Obama being the 44th President.

References

External links

AAPRCO - American Association of Private Railroad Car Owners 
Amtrak 170 Leads Train #3 West, With The Georgia 300 on June 16, 2008 uploaded to YouTube by user Treyvs
Obama's Whistle Stop Tour Train video clip showing the inspection/security train, Obama's train, and the follow-up inspection/security train with Amtrak business car Beech Grove on it.

Pullman Company
Rail passenger cars of the United States
Transportation of the president of the United States
Private railroad cars